Different Roads is a compilation album by the progressive bluegrass Maryland band The Seldom Scene, containing songs from the group's oldest period - 1973 to 1976.

Track listing
 Different Roads (John Starling) 2:35
 Old Train (Herb Pedersen, Nikki Pedersen) 2:19
 Walk Through This World With Me (Savage, Seamons) 2:07
 Gardens and Memories (John Starling) 2:44
 Wait a Minute (Herb Pedersen) 3:38
 Rebels 'Ye Rest (Pauline Beauchamp) 2:34
 Last Train from Poor Valley (Norman Blake) 3:43
 I've Lost You (Earl Scruggs) 2:39
 Keep me from Blowin' Away (Paul Craft) 2:45
 Reason for Being (John Duffey, hill) 3:22
 If That's the Way You Feel (Ralph Stanley, Carter Stanley) 2:58
 Easy Ride from Good Times to the Blues (Herb Pedersen) 3:03
 Pictures from Life's Other Side (Traditional) 4:17
 Pan American (Hank Williams) 2:45

Personnel
 John Starling - vocals, guitar
 John Duffey - mandolin, vocals
 Ben Eldridge - banjo, guitar, vocals
 Mike Auldridge - Dobro, guitar, vocals
 Tom Gray - bass, vocals

with
 Paul Craft - guitar
 Mark Cuff - drums
 Ricky Skaggs - violin, viola

References

External links
Official site

The Seldom Scene albums
2007 compilation albums